The Handball Cup of North Macedonia, is an elimination handball tournament held annually. It is the second most important national title in Macedonian handball after the Macedonian First League of Handball. Currently, RK Vardar holds the record for most titles won with 15.

Champions

Winners by season

Super Cup Winners

Performances

References

External links
 Macedonian Handball Federation  

Handball in North Macedonia